Barbara Lahr (born 25 September 1957 in Kaiserslautern) is a German singer, composer, bassist, guitarist, and producer best known for her collaboration with German 
Nu Jazz group De-Phazz.

Career
In 1980, Barbara Lahr started her career as singer with the band The Spunks. From 1984 till 1988 and again in 1993, she was singer and guitarist of the German band Guru Guru.

Awards
 1989 Deutscher Rockpreis (German Rock Award)
 1990  Studiopreis des WDR

Filmography
 Raven - Black Magic Rock  (1996) ( for Arte TV)

Discography
Solo

  Lyrical Amusement  (1998)
  Rainbow Line (2002)
  Undo Undo  (2007)
  Six String Call (2012)

with de Phazz
 Detunized Gravity  (1997)
 Death by Chocolate  (2001)
 Daily Lama  (2002)
 Natural Fake (2005)
 Days of Twang  (2007)
 Big   (2009)  feat. Radio Bigband Frankfurt
 Lala 2.0  (2010)

with others
 New Flowers (1987) with Sanfte Liebe
 Passport Rmx Vol.1 /2001) with Klaus Doldinger

References
[ De-Phazz], AMG allmusic, allmusic.com

External links
 Barbara Lahr website

German women singers
20th-century German composers
21st-century German composers
German women guitarists
Women jazz guitarists
Living people

1957 births